Gymkata is a 1985 martial arts film directed by Robert Clouse, based on Dan Tyler Moore's 1956 short story The Terrible Game. It stars Olympic gymnast Kurt Thomas as Jonathan Cabot, an Olympic gymnast who combines his gymnastic ability with martial arts to enter a deadly competition in a fictional country, Parmistan.

Plot
Jonathan Cabot (Thomas) is approached by the Special Intelligence Agency (SIA) to play "the Game". The Game is an athletic competition in the fictional country of Parmistan, a tiny mountain nation which is supposedly located in the Hindu Kush mountain range. Parmistan forces all foreigners to play the Game, which is basically an endurance race with obstacles, all the while being chased by local Parmistan warriors. If a person wins, then they are granted their life and a wish. The SIA wants Cabot to win the game so that he can use his wish to install a US satellite monitoring station, which could monitor all satellites in space and act as an early warning system in case of nuclear attack. Cabot is told that the system could save millions of lives. As an extra incentive, Cabot is also told that his father (who went missing) was actually a SIA operative who was sent to play the game but was never heard from again.
After a training period with martial arts teacher, Japanese guru, and a beautiful Parmistan princess named Princess Rubali (Tetchie Agbayani) he is deemed ready and sent to the town of Karabal, on the Caspian Sea, for infiltration into Parmistan.

While in Karabal, he is attacked by terrorist agents who kidnap Princess Rubali. Jonathan Cabot quickly raids the terrorist training center and, using his unstoppable "gymkata" fighting style that combined gymnastics with karate, easily disables dozens of terrorists before rescuing the Princess and returning to the salt mine where he is staying. However, when he returns he finds out that his handler has betrayed him to the enemy. Luckily, the SIA arrives in the nick of time to save him.

Finally, Cabot and Rubali use a raft to float down the river into Parmistan where they are promptly seized by Parmistan warriors and, after a fight, Cabot is knocked out. When Cabot wakes up, he is in the King's palace and is greeted by other players of the Game who also have arrived to play it. While waiting for the Game to start, Cabot learns from the Princess that the King's right-hand man and manager of the Game, Commander Zamir, is actually planning a coup against the King and will attempt to sell the satellite rights to the enemy. Zamir also intends to marry Princess Rubali.

With all this in mind, Cabot starts the Game but soon learns that Zamir won't play fair, and constantly breaks the strict rules of the Game in order to kill Cabot. Meanwhile, the King's forces have been overpowered by Zamir's private army in the coup attempt which the King is tricked into believing is a set of security measures for his protection.

Fighting many obstacles, including a crooked, sadistic participant named Thorg, Cabot is the only player left in the game and is about to be killed by crazed villagers when he is saved by a Parmistan warrior who turns out to be Cabot's father Colonel Cabot. His father explains that while playing the game he fell and disabled his arm, but was allowed by Parmistan warriors to live. As the two are catching up, Zamir fires an arrow into Cabot's father, who in a hushed voice tells Cabot to go on and win the race. Cabot races off, chased by Zamir's army. He is able to make his horse jump a gorge and gets away while only Zamir is brave enough to follow. Seeing that Zamir won't let him escape, Cabot decides to take him on and after a prolonged fight Cabot's gymkata skills allow him to defeat Zamir.

Meanwhile, Princess Rubali finally convinces the King that Zamir is plotting to overthrow the monarchy. Using their combined fighting skills, the Princess and the King attack Zamir's men before encouraging the citizens of Parmistan to rise up and seize the rest. As the crowd takes down Zamir's army someone cries out that a participant is approaching the finish line. As the villagers runs to see who made it, Princess Rubali is thrilled to see that Cabot is riding in on a horse, leading his father, arrow-punctured but still alive, on another horse. The crowd seizes on the champion and as the movie ends, the audience is informed that in 1985 the first satellite monitoring station was installed.

Cast

Production
The film is based on the 1957 novel The Terrible Game by Dan Tyler Moore, adapted for the screen by Charles Robert Carner (of Blind Fury fame), and shot in Yugoslavia.

Reception
Gymkata earned a Razzie Award nomination for Thomas as Worst New Star. It has developed a minor cult following as an unintentional comedy for its dubious premise, poor production quality and strange setting. Maxim lists the film as the 17th "Worst Movie of All Time".

The title became a common exclamation, along with "Hai Keeba!" on Mystery Science Theater 3000 when martial arts style fights took place in the films being riffed.

DVD release
After winning an Internet poll conducted by Warner Bros. and Amazon.com during June 2006, the film was released to DVD on January 30, 2007.

References

5. Gymkata: LIVE!, episode #70 of How Did This Get Made?

External links

 Review of Gymkata with animated screenshots at I-Mockery

1985 action films
1985 films
1985 martial arts films
American martial arts films
Films based on American novels
Films set in Asia
Gymnastics films
Metro-Goldwyn-Mayer films
Films about death games
Films shot in Yugoslavia
1980s English-language films
1980s American films